Hayy Aoor is a neighborhood of Baghdad, Iraq. 

Aoor